The 2013-14 Fogo Island League season was the competition of the second and third tier football in the island of Fogo, Cape Verde.  Its started on 23 November 2013 and finished on 30 March 2014.  The tournament was organized by the Fogo Regional Football Association (Associação Regional de Futebol de Santiago Sul, ARFF).  Académica Fogo won the 13th title, it was also the club's last title won.

Overview
Académica Fogo was the defending team of the title.  A total of 20 clubs participated in the competition, 10 in each division.  Clubs based in the municipalities of São Filipe and Santa Catarina do Fogo were played at Estádio 5 de Julho while clubs based in Mosteiros Municipality were played at Estádio Francisco José Rodrigues, matches in Mosteiros were played each Saturday, sometimes with two matches while the Second Division matches in Mosteiros featuring Atlético were played each Sunday.

A total of 310 goals were scored, the largest of any scored in any island league.  The largest win was Académica do Fogo who scored 8-1 over Grito Povo on November 30, 2013, it was also the club who scored 7-0 over União São Lourenço on 23 February 2014.  It was also the club who won away 1-7 over União São Lourenço on 15 December 2013.  It would be next club in years to win team home and away with a larger number of goals against a single team in Cape Verde and also the same high number being 7.

Juventude finished last and along with Grito Povo were relegated, Juventude returned for the 2015-16 season.  Baxada and Parque Real were leaders in the Second Division.  Parque Real defeated Grito Povo in its division decisional matches.  Baxada spend the next three seasons in that division while Parque Real were relegated in the following season.

Botafogo took the lead in its first week, then Académica for the rest of the season with the exception of weeks 5 to 7 where Nô Pintcha took it for a week then Spartak d'Aguadinha for two weeks.

Académica Fogo scored the most numbering 59, 9th place Grito Povo scored the least with 21.  Also Académica conceded the least numbering 15 and Grito Povo the most numbering 51. Both Desportivo and Travadores scored the most goals numbering 37, Sporting was second with 36 and Vitòria scored the least numbering 12, a club who scored the least that was 5th place.  Varanda conceded the most goals numbering 37, Tchadense second with 24 and Vitòria with 32, a club who conceded the most that was 5th place.

There were no competition on the last week of December, the first week of January due to the regional cup competitions.

Participating clubs

Premier Division
 Académica do Fogo
 Botafogo FC
 Cutelinho FC - Mosteiros
 Juventude
 Grito Povo - Ribeira do Ilhéu
 Nô Pintcha - Mosteiros
 Spartak D'Aguadinha
 União de São Lourenço
 Valência - As Hortas
 Vulcânicos

Second Division
ABC de Patim
Atlântico - São Filipe
Atlético - Mosteiros
Baxada - Cova Figueira
Brasilim - Monte Urca
Esperança - Achada Furna
Luzabril - Luzia Nunes
Nova Era
Parque Real - Cova Figueira

League standings

Premier Division

Second Division
1st: Baxada
2nd: Parque Real
4th: Desportivo de Cova Figueira

Results

Position changes

Statistics
Biggest win:
Académica (Fogo) 8-1 Grito Povo (November 30, 2013)
União São Lourenço 1-7 Académica Fogo (December 15, 2013)
Most differences in number of goals:
Académica Fogo 7-0 União São Lourenço
Longest number one streak: Académica Fogo (weeks 8-18)
Longest last place streak: Grito Povo (weeks 1-13)

References

External links
*
2013-14 Fogo Island League at RSSSF

Fogo football seasons
2013–14 in Cape Verdean football